San Carlos Circuit is a motorsport race track located in San Carlos, Venezuela. From 1977 to 1979, it hosted the Venezuelan motorcycle Grand Prix.

Lap records

The official race lap records at the San Carlos Circuit are listed as:

External links
Track information

Motorsport venues in Venezuela
Grand Prix motorcycle circuits